The BMW 320 was a car manufactured by Bayerische Motoren Werke AG also known as BMW in Germany from 1937 to 1938, the successor to the 319-based BMW 329. It was offered in 2 door saloon and convertible versions. Approximately 4,200 cars were made, of which 1,835 were cabriolets. 

The car was first presented in July 1937. It showed a very similar resemblance to the 329. It was a high performance car with many admirers. The 320 had a top speed of 65mph. The suspension, which was carried over from the 329, consisted of an independent front suspension with a high-mounted transverse leaf spring acting as upper control arms and a conventional live axle on semi-elliptic springs at the rear. It had a slightly greater displacement 6-cylinder engine. It was available as a two-door sedan or two-door convertible and stayed until 1938. The BMW 320 was smaller, less expensive, and lighter than its predecessor. It offered easy handling, a fine finish, and a good power-to-weight ratio.

The 320 was replaced by the BMW 321 in 1938.

References
Citations

Bibliography

320
Executive cars
Rear-wheel-drive vehicles
Cars introduced in 1937
Compact executive cars
Convertibles
Sedans